Garbiñe Muguruza was the two-time defending champion, but chose not to participate.

Elina Svitolina won the title, defeating Marie Bouzková in the final, 7–5, 4–6, 6–4.

Seeds

Draw

Finals

Top half

Bottom half

Qualifying

Seeds

Qualifiers

Lucky losers

Qualifying draw

First qualifier

Second qualifier

Third qualifier

Fourth qualifier

Fifth qualifier

Sixth qualifier

References

External Links
Main Draw
Qualifying Draw

2020 Singles
Monterrey Open - Singles